HEX: Shards of Fate (Hex, Hex TCG or Hex: Card Clash) was a massively multiplayer online trading card game (MMOTCG) by Cryptozoic Entertainment. It is the first game in the MMOTCG genre. It was funded via Kickstarter, and raised  while its campaign was active. As of October 28, 2013, Hex was the 11th most-funded video game on Kickstarter. The game was officially released on January 26, 2016, and was playable on Windows, OS X and iOS.

Hex: Shards of Fate started Closed Alpha testing on October 8, 2013. In April 2014, the game went into Closed Beta, which included all Kickstarter backers as well as so-called "Slacker Backers", with new players being invited to join in the following months. As of May 2015, the game was available on PC in an early access phase and clients for iOS and Android were being worked on. As a digital TCG, it featured unique features, such as being able to modify cards pre-match and transform cards during the match. The game was shut down and closed permanently in December 2020.

Lawsuit

On May 14, 2014, Wizards of the Coast filed a lawsuit against Cryptozoic for infringement of intellectual property, claiming that Hex: Shards of Fate is nearly a clone of Magic: The Gathering. Wizards of the Coast says "While we appreciate a robust and thriving trading card game industry, we will not permit the misappropriation of our intellectual property." On May 19, 2014, Cryptozoic responded to the lawsuit that "Although we take all pending litigation seriously, we do not find any merit to the allegations in the complaint." On Sep 24, 2015, Wizards of the Coast, Cryptozoic Entertainment and Hex Entertainment settled the lawsuit with undisclosed terms.

Sets  
Expansion sets:
 Shards of Fate
 Shattered Destiny
 Armies of Myth
 Primal Dawn
 Herofall
 Scars of War
 Frostheart
 Dead of Winter
 Doombringer

References

External links

2016 video games
Cryptozoic Entertainment games
Free-to-play video games
IOS games
Kickstarter-funded video games
MacOS games
Massively multiplayer online games
Digital collectible card games
PlayStation 4 games
Video games developed in the United States
Video games with cross-platform play
Windows games